María Angélica Cristi Marfil (born 13 October 1941) is a Chilean politician who served as deputy and mayor in times of Augusto Pinochet's dictatorship.

References

External links
 BCN Profile

1940 births
Living people
Chilean sociologists
Chilean women sociologists
Chilean anti-communists
People from Santiago
Pontifical Catholic University of Chile alumni
Independent Democratic Union politicians